Bad4Good was a heavy metal band formed in 1991 by guitarist Steve Vai.  The band was a quartet of teenagers, the oldest of whom was 16. The group consisted of guitarist Thomas McRocklin, bassist Zack Young, drummer Brooks Wackerman, and singer Danny Cooksey.

Under Vai's guidance, the band released one album in 1992 called Refugee. The only single released was "Nineteen" and it failed to chart but the music video was featured on MTV for some time. They also went on to tour briefly with Damn Yankees. After the band disbanded, Wackerman went on to play drums for Bad Religion, and now for Avenged Sevenfold, Young plays drums for the band AI, and Cooksey has had a successful career as a voice-over artist and also returned to his roots to play in Los Angeles country and western bands. McRocklin appeared in the music video for Vai's 1990 song "The Audience is Listening", playing Steve Vai as a kid.

Band members
 Danny Cooksey – lead vocals
 Thomas McRocklin – lead guitar
 Zack Young – bass guitar, backing vocals
 Brooks Wackerman – drums

Discography
 Refugee (1992)

See also
List of glam metal bands and artists

References

External links
Bad4Good on Myspace
Music video for "Nineteen" on YouTube

American glam metal musical groups
Musical groups established in 1991
1991 establishments in the United States